Norio Suzuki may refer to: 

, Japanese golfer
, Japanese explorer
, Japanese footballer